Terrence C. Carson (born November 19, 1958) is an American actor and singer, best known for portraying Kyle Barker on the FOX sitcom Living Single and voicing Mace Windu in various Star Wars media. He is also known for his long-running voice role as Kratos in the God of War video game series from 2005 until 2013.

Life and career
Carson was born in Chicago, Illinois. He grew up as an only child, raised by his mother, in the LeClaire Courts projects of the Chicago Housing Authority. He attended the University of Illinois at Urbana–Champaign and in 1981 became a member of the Iota Phi Theta fraternity.

Carson is best known for his role as Kyle Barker on the hit 1990s sitcom Living Single. His character was a series regular for the first four seasons and bumped to recurring status for the remainder of the series' run due to Carson's clash with the new writers. Years later, he would characterize this as a firing.  Carson provided the voice of Samuel in the PBS Kids animated series Clifford the Big Red Dog. As a voice actor, he voiced Mace Windu in the animated series Star Wars: Clone Wars; he reprised his role as Mace Windu in the Star Wars: The Clone Wars series. He portrayed Route 23 survivor and school teacher Eugene Dix in Final Destination 2. He has provided the male voice of Guillo in the GameCube RPG Baten Kaitos Origins and is the voice of Touchstone in the PlayStation Portable shooter Syphon Filter: Dark Mirror.

His first voicing of Kratos was for the original God of War for the PlayStation 2 and his final voicing of the character was in God of War: Ascension for the PlayStation 3, in which he also did the motion capture. Carson also provided Kratos's voice where Kratos was a downloadable character in Everybody's Golf 5 and a guest character in Soulcalibur: Broken Destiny, Mortal Kombat (PlayStation 3 and PlayStation Vita versions, 2011 and 2012, respectively) and PlayStation All-Stars Battle Royale. Christopher Judge took over the role of Kratos in God of War for the PlayStation 4, the reason being Carson was not tall enough for the motion-capture and also because of Judge's chemistry with Sunny Suljic who plays Kratos' son Atreus.

In 2002, Carson released a jazz/funk CD called Truth. In 2017, T.C was featured on the cover of STS Entertainment & Fashion magazine.

Discography
Albums
 Truth (2002)
 Live in Beverly Hills (2014)

Filmography

Film

Television

Video games

References

External links

Living people
African-American male actors
20th-century African-American male singers
American jazz singers
American male television actors
American male video game actors
American male voice actors
Male actors from Chicago
University of Illinois Urbana-Champaign alumni
21st-century African-American male singers
1958 births